Wiltshire (abbreviated Wilts) is a historic and ceremonial county in South West England with an area of . It is landlocked and borders the counties of Dorset to the southwest, Somerset to the west, Hampshire to the southeast, Gloucestershire to the north, Oxfordshire to the northeast and Berkshire to the east. The county town was originally Wilton, after which the county is named, but Wiltshire Council is now based in the county town of Trowbridge. Within the county's boundary are two unitary authority areas, Wiltshire and Swindon, governed respectively by Wiltshire Council and Swindon Borough Council.

Wiltshire is characterised by its high downland and wide valleys. Salisbury Plain is noted for being the location of the Stonehenge and Avebury stone circles (which together are a UNESCO Cultural and World Heritage site) and other ancient landmarks, and as a training area for the British Army. The city of Salisbury is notable for its medieval cathedral. Swindon is the county’s largest town and commercial centre, with a population of 230,000. Large country houses open to the public include Longleat (where there is also a safari park) and the National Trust's Stourhead.

Toponymy
The county, in the 9th century written as Wiltunscir, later Wiltonshire, is named after the former county town of Wilton.

History

Wiltshire is notable for its pre-Roman archaeology. The Mesolithic, Neolithic and Bronze Age people that occupied southern Britain built settlements on the hills and downland that cover Wiltshire. Stonehenge and Avebury are perhaps the most famous Neolithic sites in the UK.

In the 6th and 7th centuries Wiltshire was at the western edge of Saxon Britain, as Cranborne Chase and the Somerset Levels prevented the advance to the west. The Battle of Bedwyn was fought in 675 between Escuin, a West Saxon nobleman who had seized the throne of Queen Saxburga, and King Wulfhere of Mercia. In 878 the Danes invaded the county. Following the Norman Conquest in 1066, large areas of the country came into the possession of the crown and the church.

At the time of the Domesday Survey, the industry of Wiltshire was largely agricultural; 390 mills are mentioned, and vineyards at Tollard and Lacock. In the succeeding centuries sheep-farming was vigorously pursued, and the Cistercian monastery of Stanley exported wool to the Florentine and Flemish markets in the 13th and 14th centuries.

In the 17th century English Civil War Wiltshire was largely Parliamentarian. The Battle of Roundway Down, a Royalist victory, was fought near Devizes.

In 1794 it was decided at a meeting at the Bear Inn in Devizes to raise a body of ten independent troops of Yeomanry for the county of Wiltshire, which formed the basis for what would become the Royal Wiltshire Yeomanry, who served with distinction both at home and abroad, during the Boer War, World War I and World War II. The Royal Wiltshire Yeomanry currently lives on as Y (RWY) Squadron, based in Swindon, and B (RWY) Squadron, based in Salisbury, of the Royal Wessex Yeomanry.

Around 1800 the Kennet and Avon Canal was built through Wiltshire, providing a route for transporting cargoes from Bristol to London until the development of the Great Western Railway.

Information on the 261 civil parishes of Wiltshire is available on Wiltshire Council's Wiltshire Community History website which has maps, demographic data, historic and modern pictures and short histories.

The local nickname for Wiltshire natives is "Moonrakers". This originated from a story of smugglers who managed to foil the local Excise men by hiding their alcohol, possibly French brandy in barrels or kegs, in a village pond. When confronted by the excise men they raked the surface to conceal the submerged contraband with ripples, and claimed that they were trying to rake in a large round cheese visible in the pond, really a reflection of the full moon. The officials took them for simple yokels or mad and left them alone, allowing them to continue with their illegal activities. Many villages claim the tale for their own village pond, but the story is most commonly linked with The Crammer in Devizes.

Geology, landscape and ecology

Two-thirds of Wiltshire, a mostly rural county, lies on chalk, a kind of soft, white, porous limestone that is resistant to erosion, giving it a high chalk downland landscape. This chalk is part of a system of chalk downlands throughout eastern and southern England formed by the rocks of the Chalk Group and stretching from the Dorset Downs in the west to Dover in the east. The largest area of chalk in Wiltshire is Salisbury Plain, which is used mainly for arable agriculture and by the British Army as training ranges.

The chalk uplands run northeast into West Berkshire in the Marlborough Downs ridge, and southwest into Dorset as Cranborne Chase. Cranborne Chase, which straddles the border, has, like Salisbury Plain, yielded much Stone Age and Bronze Age archaeology. The Marlborough Downs are part of the North Wessex Downs AONB (Area of Outstanding Natural Beauty), a  conservation area.

In the northwest of the county, on the border with South Gloucestershire and Bath and North East Somerset, the underlying rock is the resistant oolite limestone of the Cotswolds. Part of the Cotswolds AONB is also in Wiltshire, in the county's northwestern corner.

Between the areas of chalk and limestone downland are clay valleys and vales. The largest of these vales is the Avon Vale. The Avon cuts diagonally through the north of the county, flowing through Bradford-on-Avon and into Bath and Bristol. The Vale of Pewsey has been cut through the chalk into Greensand and Oxford Clay in the centre of the county. In the south west of the county is the Vale of Wardour. The southeast of the county lies on the sandy soils of the northernmost area of the New Forest.

Chalk is a porous rock, so the chalk hills have little surface water. The main settlements in the county are therefore situated at wet points. Notably, Salisbury is situated between the chalk of Salisbury Plain and marshy flood plains.

Green belt 

The county has a green belt mainly along its western fringes as a part of the extensive Avon Green Belt. It reaches as far as the outskirts of Rudloe/Corsham and Trowbridge, preventing urban sprawl particularly from the latter in the direction of Bradford-on-Avon, and affording further protection to surrounding villages and towns from Bath in Somerset.

Climate
Along with the rest of South West England, Wiltshire has a temperate climate which is generally wetter and milder than counties further east. Although there is a marked maritime influence, this is generally rather less pronounced, than it is for other south-western counties, which have a greater proximity to the sea. In the summer the Azores high pressure affects southwest England; however, convective cloud sometimes forms inland, reducing the number of hours of sunshine. Annual sunshine rates are slightly less than the regional average of 1,600 hours.

In December 1998 there were 20 days without sun recorded at Yeovilton (Somerset). Most of the rainfall in the southwest is caused by Atlantic depressions or by convection, though a proportion is caused orographically (uplift over hills). A greater proportion of rainfall is in autumn and winter, caused by the Atlantic depressions, which is when they are most active. Even so, any month can be the wettest or driest in a given year but the wettest is much more likely to be in the winter half-year (Oct-Mar) and the driest in the summer half-year (Apr-Sept). In summer, a greater proportion of the rainfall is caused by sun heating the ground leading to convection and to showers and thunderstorms, though it is often the northern half of the county that sees most of the showers with south-westerly winds, in summer, whereas in the south of the county, the proximity of a relatively cold English Channel, often inhibits the development of showers. In autumn and winter, however, the sea is often relatively warm, compared with the air passing over it and can often lead to a higher rainfall in the south of the county e.g. Salisbury recorded over 200mm of rain in Nov 2009 and January 2014. About 8–15 days of snowfall is typical. November to March have the highest mean wind speeds, and June to August have the lightest winds. The predominant wind direction is from the southwest.

Economy

This is a chart of trend of regional gross value added (GVA) of Wiltshire at current basic prices with figures in millions of British Pounds Sterling.

The Wiltshire economy benefits from the "M4 corridor effect", which attracts business, and the attractiveness of its countryside, towns and villages. The northern part of the county is richer than the southern part, particularly since Swindon is home to national and international corporations such as Intel, Motorola, Patheon, Catalent (formerly known as Cardinal Health), Becton-Dickinson, WHSmith, Early Learning Centre and Nationwide, with Dyson located in nearby Malmesbury. Wiltshire's employment structure is distinctive in having a significantly higher number of people in various forms of manufacturing (especially electrical equipment and apparatus, food products, and beverages, furniture, rubber, pharmaceuticals, and plastic goods) than the national average.

In addition, there is higher-than-average employment in public administration and defence, due to the military establishments around the county, particularly around Amesbury and Corsham. There are sizeable British Army barracks at Tidworth, Bulford and Warminster, and the Royal School of Artillery is at Larkhill. Further north, RAF Lyneham was home to the RAF's Hercules C130 fleet until 2011; the MoD Lyneham site is now a centre for Army technical training. Wiltshire is also distinctive for the high proportion of its working-age population who are economically active (86.6% in 1999–2000) and its low unemployment rates. The gross domestic product (GDP) level in Wiltshire did not reach the UK average in 1998, and was only marginally above the rate for South West England.

Education

Wiltshire has thirty county secondary schools, publicly funded, of which the largest is Warminster Kingdown, and eleven independent secondaries, including Marlborough College, St Mary's Calne, Dauntsey's near Devizes, and Warminster School. The county schools are nearly all comprehensives, with the older pattern of education surviving only in Salisbury, which has two grammar schools (South Wilts Grammar School and Bishop Wordsworth's School) and three non-selective schools.

There are four further education colleges, which also provide some higher education: New College (Swindon); Wiltshire College (Chippenham, Trowbridge and Salisbury); Salisbury Sixth Form College; and Swindon College. Wiltshire is also home to a University Technical College, UTC Swindon, specialising in engineering. A second UTC, South Wiltshire UTC, was based in Salisbury but closed in August 2020.

Wiltshire is one of the few remaining English counties without a university or university college; the closest university to the county town of Trowbridge is the University of Bath. However, Bath Spa University has a centre at Corsham Court in Corsham, and Oxford Brookes University maintains a minor campus in Swindon (almost 50 km from Oxford). Swindon is the UK's second largest centre of population (after Milton Keynes) without its own university.

Service Children's Education has its headquarters in Trenchard Lines in Upavon, Wiltshire.

Demographics
The county registered a population of 680,137 in the 2011 Census. Wiltshire (outside Swindon) has a low population density of 1.4 persons per hectare, when compared against 4.1 for England as a whole.

Historical population of Wiltshire county:

Politics and administration

Europe 
At the 2016 European Union membership referendum, Wiltshire voted in favour of Brexit.

Westminster Parliamentary
At the 2019 general election, all seven Wiltshire constituencies (including the two Swindon constituencies) returned Conservative MPs. The two Swindon constituencies are seen as marginal, bellwether constituencies between Labour and the Conservatives. Conversely, the Chippenham constituency is traditionally contested between the Liberal Democrats and Conservatives, with Liberal Democrat Duncan Hames holding the seat until 2015. The Liberal Democrats also finished second in Devizes, North Wiltshire and Salisbury whereas Labour, in addition to the two Swindon seats, finished second in Wiltshire South West.

The 2023 Periodic Review of Westminster constituencies' initial proposals recommended wide-ranging changes to Wiltshire's electoral boundaries which would see the North Wiltshire seat extended across the county border into Gloucestershire.

Councils

The ceremonial county of Wiltshire consists of two unitary authority areas, Wiltshire and Swindon, governed respectively by Wiltshire Council and Swindon Borough Council. As a result of elections held in 2021, Wiltshire Council comprises 61 Conservatives, 27 Liberal Democrats, seven Independents and three Labour members. Swindon Borough Council has 34 Conservative councillors and 23 Labour members.

Until the 2009 structural changes to local government, Wiltshire (apart from Swindon) was a two-level county, divided into four local government districts – Kennet, North Wiltshire, Salisbury and West Wiltshire – which existed alongside Wiltshire County Council, covering the same area and carrying out more strategic tasks, such as education and county roads. However, on 1 April 2009 these five local authorities were merged into a single unitary authority called Wiltshire Council. With the abolition of the District of Salisbury, a new Salisbury City Council was created at the same time to carry out several citywide functions and to hold the city's charter.

Sport

The county is represented in the Football League by Swindon Town, who play at the County Ground stadium near Swindon town centre. They joined the Football League on the creation of the Third Division in 1920, and have remained in the league ever since. Their most notable achievements include winning the Football League Cup in 1969 and the Anglo-Italian Cup in 1970, two successive promotions in 1986 and 1987 (taking them from the Fourth Division to the Second), promotion to the Premier League as Division One play-off winners in 1993 (as inaugural members), the Division Two title in 1996, and their promotion to League One in 2007 after finishing third in League Two.

Chippenham Town is the area's highest-ranked non-league football club; they currently play in the National League South after winning the Southern Premier League in 2016/17, with a league record points tally of 103. After Salisbury City went into liquidation in 2014, a new club, Salisbury, was formed and plays in the Southern Premier League.

Wiltshire County Cricket Club play in the Minor Counties league.

Swindon Robins Speedway team, who competed in the top national division, the SGB Premiership, had been at their track at the Blunsdon Abbey Stadium near Swindon since 1949. In 2020 they stopped racing due to the Covid-19 Pandemic and subsequently announced in 2022 that they would not be returning. Swindon Wildcats compete in the English Premier Ice Hockey League, the second tier of British ice hockey, and play their home games at Swindon's Link Centre.

Principal settlements

Wiltshire has twenty-one towns and one city:

Amesbury
Bradford-on-Avon
Calne
Chippenham
Corsham
Cricklade
Devizes
Highworth (Borough of Swindon)
Larkhill
Ludgershall
Malmesbury
Marlborough
Melksham
Mere
Royal Wootton Bassett
Salisbury (city)
Swindon (Borough of Swindon)
Tidworth
Trowbridge
Warminster
Westbury
Wilton
A list of settlements is at List of places in Wiltshire.

Television
The county is covered by BBC West and ITV West Country; however, Swindon and Salisbury receive BBC South and ITV Meridian.

Places of interest

Places of interest in Wiltshire include:

Areas of countryside in Wiltshire include:
Cranborne Chase 
Marlborough Downs 
Salisbury Plain 
Vale of Pewsey

Transport

Road
Roads running through Wiltshire include The Ridgeway, an ancient route, and Roman roads the Fosse Way, London to Bath road and Ermin Way. National Cycle Route 4 and the Thames Path, a modern long distance footpath, run through the county.

Routes through Wiltshire include:
A4 road
M4 motorway / M4 Corridor
A303 trunk road
A350 road
A417 road

Navigable inland waterways
River Thames
Kennet and Avon Canal

Canals subject to restoration
Thames and Severn Canal
North Wilts Canal
Wilts & Berks Canal

Rail
Three main railway routes, all of which carry passenger traffic, cross Wiltshire.
Great Western Main Line (Swindon and Chippenham)
Wessex Main Line (Bradford-on-Avon, Melksham, Trowbridge, Westbury, Warminster, Salisbury; connects to Chippenham)
West of England line (Salisbury and Tisbury)
Other routes include:
Reading to Taunton Line
Heart of Wessex Line
Golden Valley Line
South Wales Main Line
The major junction stations are Salisbury and Westbury, and important junctions are also found at Swindon,  and Trowbridge.

There is also the Swindon and Cricklade Railway in the Thames Valley.

In general, Wiltshire is well served by rail, with 14 stations within its boundaries, although towns not served include Calne, Marlborough and Devizes. Several destinations on bus routes, including the aforementioned three towns, have integrated through ticketing where one ticket may be bought to cover both the bus and rail journey.

Air
Airfields in Wiltshire include Old Sarum Airfield and Clench Common Airfield. RAF Lyneham was an air transport hub for British forces until its closure in 2012. Airports with scheduled services near Wiltshire include Bournemouth Airport, Bristol Airport, Cardiff Airport, Exeter Airport, Gloucestershire Airport, Oxford Airport, Heathrow Airport and Southampton Airport.

See also

Custos Rotulorum of Wiltshire – Keepers of the Rolls
Flag of Wiltshire
Grade I listed buildings in Wiltshire
Great West Way
Healthcare in Wiltshire
High Sheriff of Wiltshire
List of civil parishes in Wiltshire
List of Deputy Lieutenants of Wiltshire
List of hills of Wiltshire
List of Sites of Special Scientific Interest in Wiltshire
Lord Lieutenant of Wiltshire
The Vly be on the Turmut – unofficial song of the county
Wiltshire (UK Parliament constituency)
Wiltshire Horn, a breed of sheep

References

External links

 Wiltshire Council
 Merlin local information (Wiltshire council)
 Wiltshire Community History (Wiltshire council)
 Geology map of Wiltshire (PDF) (Wiltshire council)
 Wiltshire Tourist Office
 Images of Wiltshire at the English Heritage Archive
 

 
Ceremonial counties of England
Counties of England established in antiquity
English unitary authorities created in 2009
Unitary authority districts of England
Local government districts of Wiltshire
Counties in South West England